The Mamores are a group of mountains in the Lochaber area of the Grampian Mountains in the Scottish Highlands. They form an east–west ridge approximately fifteen kilometres in length lying between Glen Nevis to the north and Loch Leven to the south.

Ten of the ranges are classified as Munros; from west to east these are:

Mullach nan Coirean (939 m)
Stob Bàn (999 m)
Sgurr a' Mhàim (1099 m)
Am Bodach (1032 m)
Stob Coire a' Chàirn (981 m)
An Gearanach (982 m)
Na Gruagaichean (1056 m)
Binnein Mòr (1130 m)
Binnein Beag (943 m)
Sgurr Eilde Mòr (1010 m)

The main backbone of the Mamores stretches from Meall a' Chaorainn, a subsidiary top of Mullach nan Coirean, at the western end of the ridge, to Sgòr Eilde Beag, a top of Binnein Mòr some 10 km to the east. Three narrow arêtes run north from the main ridge connecting to the summits of Sgurr a' Mhàim, An Gearanach and Binnein Mòr. Beyond the eastern end of the ridge are two steep outlying peaks: Binnein Beag and Sgurr Eilde Mòr. Sandwiched between the remote upper section of Glen Nevis, and Lochs Eilde Mòr and Eilde Beag, these two peaks are the remotest in the Mamores.

For hillwalkers the Mamores are accessible from either side - the village of Kinlochleven lies on the southern side, whilst upper Glen Nevis gives access from the north. The full traverse is challenging, either as a long day for fit walkers or as a multi-day trip. Given the relative ease of access, several peaks can be combined to give a number of shorter day's walking. Probably the best known shorter route is the  Ring of Steall, a circuit of the corrie above Steall Falls. This route takes in four Munro peaks: Sgurr a' Mhàim, Am Bodach, Stob Coire a' Chàirn and An Gearanach. It forms the basis for the Ring of Steall Skyrace course.

Lochaber
Mountain ranges of Scotland
Geography of Highland (council area)